Pleasurewood Hills is a theme park on a  site between Corton and Gunton, near Lowestoft, Suffolk.

History
The park was created by entrepreneur Joe Larter in 1983 as a small American-themed family attraction, containing a miniature railway, Cine 180 and adventure playground. Yearly expansion brought the addition of new attractions and general improvements. Controlling interest in the park was sold to RKF, a property development company, in the late 1980s. RKF built attractions including two Sea Life centres (Great Yarmouth & Hunstanton), a Ripley's Believe It or Not (Great Yarmouth seafront) and the  Bure Valley Railway (in Aylsham). It started building a second Pleasurewood Hills style park in Cleethorpes. RKF went bankrupt in early 1991 and its attractions were sold. Some Pleasurewood management staff took control of The Bygone Village at Fleggburgh.

Noel Edmonds converted the Haunted Theatre into Crinkley Bottom Castle in the mid-1990s. The park also featured appearances by Mr Blobby and Edmonds himself.

The park continued in this vein until 1996–1997, when it was bought by Leisure Great Britain, a caravan park operator. It owned the park until 2000, when Peter and Peggy Hadden, who had been connected with the park for many years, bought it. The name changed to New Pleasurewood Hills. In 2000 the park bought Magic Mouse.

In 2004, Grévin & Cie, a French leisure group, purchased the site. The name reverted to its original form and in early 2005 the owners said they would spend £3 million on improvements.

Changes included repainting and renaming a number of rides, but the first major investment was in the park's first inverting coaster, Wipeout, from the closed American Adventure. The old cars were scrapped and new ones bought from Walibi World.

In 2009 the Mellow Yellow log flume was repainted and had a revamped entrance. It is now called Timber Falls. In 2010 the park put a StreetDance show in the Castle Theatre. In 2010 the park appointed a new manager.

On 30 January 2011, it was announced that the park had been sold to a new company. , in partnership with industry expert Laurent Bruloy, purchased seven leisure parks, including Pleasurewood Hills, from across Europe. The seven parks will benefit from a joint investment of around £1.7million over 5 years. This included the addition of 5 new attractions for the 2012 season and another 4 a year later.

Roller Coasters

Flat Rides

Water & Dark Rides

Kids & Other Rides

Shows

Past Rides

References

External links

 Official site
 
 Pleasurewood Place: Fan Website and Forum

Amusement parks in England
Tourist attractions in Suffolk
1983 establishments in England
Compagnie des Alpes
Amusement parks opened in 1983